Neo-Byzantine architecture (also referred to as Byzantine Revival) was a revival movement, most frequently seen in religious, institutional and public buildings. It incorporates elements of the Byzantine style associated with Eastern and Orthodox Christian architecture dating from the 5th through 11th centuries, notably that of Constantinople (present-day Istanbul) and the Exarchate of Ravenna.

Neo-Byzantine architecture emerged in the 1840s in Western Europe and peaked in the last quarter of the 19th century with the Sacré-Coeur Basilica in Paris, and with monumental works in the Russian Empire, and later Bulgaria. The Neo-Byzantine school was active in Yugoslavia in the interwar period.

Russian Empire

Sophia Cathedral in Pushkin (1782–1788) was the earliest and isolated experiment with Byzantine treatment of otherwise neoclassical structures. In 1830s Nicholas I of Russia promoted the so-called Russo-Byzantine style of churches designed by Konstantin Thon. Nicholas I despised true Byzantine art; Thon's style in fact had little common with it. Notably, Thon routinely replaced the circular Byzantine arch with a keel-shaped gable, and the hemispherical Byzantine dome with an onion dome; layout and structural scheme of his churches clearly belonged to neoclassical standard.

True Byzantine art, popularized by Grigory Gagarin and David Grimm, was adopted by Alexander II of Russia as the de facto official style of the Orthodox Church. Byzantine architecture became a vehicle of Orthodox expansion on the frontiers of Empire (Congress Poland, Crimea, the Caucasus). However, few buildings were completed in the reign of Alexander II due to financial troubles. Alexander III changed state preference in favor of Russian Revival trend based on 16th-17th century Moscow and Yaroslavl tradition, yet Byzantine architecture remained a common choice, especially for large cathedrals. Neo-Byzantine cathedrals concentrated in the western provinces (Poland, Lithuania), the Army bases in Caucasus and Central Asia, the Cossack hosts and the industrial region in Urals around the city of Perm. Architects David Grimm and Vasily Kosyakov developed a unique national type of a single-dome Byzantine cathedral with four symmetrical pendentive apses that became de facto standard in 1880s-1890s.

The reign of Nicholas II was notable for the architect's turn from this standard back to Hagia Sophia legacy, peaking in the Naval Cathedral in Kronstadt and Poti cathedral. These designs employed reinforced concrete that allowed very fast construction schedule; their interiors contained clear references to contemporary Art Nouveau yet the exteriors were a clear homage to medieval Constantinople. Russian Neo-Byzantine tradition was terminated by the revolution of 1917 but was continued by emigrant architects in Yugoslavia and Harbin.

Southeast Europe

Bulgaria

The Bulgarian Neo-Byzantine style from the end of the 19th and the beginning of the 20th century is often a combination of Byzantine, typical Bulgarian, Eastern Orthodox and Secession/ Art Nouveau/ Modernisme elements.

 Alexander Nevsky Cathedral, Sofia (1882-1912);
 Dormition of the Mother of God Cathedral, Varna (1882-1885);
 Faculty of Theology (Sofia University) (1908-1912)
 Regional History Museum Sofia, former Sofia Central Public Mineral Baths (1913) -  the building was designed in the Vienna Secession style, but integrating typically Byzantine, Bulgarian and Eastern Orthodox ornamental elements;
 Sofia Theological Seminary (1902-1914);
 Vrana Palace - the building of the New Palace in "Vrana" is a two-storey massive building, executed in typical Bulgarian style with Secession elements, combined in an elegant neo-Byzantine spirit.
 Church of St Paraskeva, Sofia (1926-1930).
 St. Nedelya Cathedral Church (10th century, 1933), Sofia

Greece
 Cathedral of Saint Andrew, Patras (1908-1974)
 Church of Saint Panteleimon of Acharnai, Athens (1910-1930)

Romania

 Entrance of the Laurențiu and Louise Steinebach House, Bucharest (most of its architectural elements, both exterior the interior, with little Romanian Revival influences)
 People's Salvation Cathedral, Bucharest
 Holy Trinity Cathedral, Sibiu
 Coronation Cathedral, Alba Iulia
 Cathedral of Saints Peter and Paul, Constanța
 Domnița Bălașa Church, Bucharest
 Doctor Ion and Maria Urlățeanu House, Bucharest
 Aleea Alexandru no. 40, Bucharest
 Strada Pictor Constantin Stahi no. 18, Bucharest
 Strada Austrului no. 9, Bucharest
 Bulevardul Dacia no. 42, Bucharest
 Doctor Dobrovici House, Bucharest

Serbia

Serbia's modern sacral architecture got its main impetus from the dynastic burial church in Oplenac which was commissioned by the Karađorđeviċ dynasty 1909. With the arrival of Russian émigré artists after the October Revolution, Belgrade's main governmental edifices were planned by eminent Russian architects trained in Russia. It was King Aleksandar I. who was the patron of the neobyzantine mouvement. Its main proponents were Aleksandar Deroko, Momir Korunović,  and Nikolay Krasnov. Their main contribution were the royal castles on Dedinje, the Church of Saint Sava and the St. Mark's Church in Belgrade. After the communist era ended,  and Nebojša Popović were proponents of new tendencies in sacral architecture which used classic examples in the Byzantine tradition.

German states

Earliest examples of emerging Byzantine-Romanesque architecture include the Alexander Nevsky Memorial Church, Potsdam, by Russian architect Vasily Stasov, and the Abbey of Saint Boniface, laid down by Ludwig I of Bavaria in 1835 and completed in 1840. The basilica followed the rules of 6th-century Ravenna architecture, although its corinthian order was a clear deviation from the historical Byzantine art. In 1876 Ludwig II of Bavaria commissioned Neo-Byzantine interiors of the externally Romanesque Neuschwanstein Castle, complete with mosaic images of Justinian I and Greek saints.

Danish architect Theophil Hansen became a supporter of the style in the 1850s. His major works belonged to the Neo-Grec and Neo-Renaissance style, however, Hansen as a professor of Byzantine art in the Academy of Fine Arts in Vienna shaped a generation of architects that popularized Neo-Byzantine architecture in Austro-Hungary, Serbia and post-war Yugoslavia. Hansen's own Neo-Byzantine work includes the Arsenal in Vienna (1852—1856, with Ludwig Förster), the Holy Trinity Greek Orthodox Church, Vienna (1856—1858) and the Christuskirche in Matzleindorf, Vienna (1858—1860).

Several Neo-Byzantine-style churches were constructed during the Gründerzeit, for instance, the Sacred Heart Church or the Rosary Basilica, both located in Berlin.

France
One of the earliest examples in France is the enormous Marseille Cathedral, built between 1852 and 1893, and the basilica of Notre-Dame de la Garde, both located in Marseille.

Another example is the Russian orthodox Alexander Nevsky Cathedral in Paris build 1859-1861. 

The Saint-Augustin in Paris build between 1860 and 1871 is an example of Eclectic Romano-Byzantine architecture. 

A prominent example of Byzantine Revival architecture in France is the Basilica of Sacre-Coeur in Paris, built between 1875 and 1914, based on the original plan of Paul Abadie. It features five elongated domes on the exterior and an interior with mosaics and other art inspired by Byzantine art.  Inspired by the former is another excellent example - the Basilica of Sainte-Thérèse, Lisieux completed in 1954.

Great Britain and Ireland
Westminster Cathedral (1895–1903), the Catholic cathedral in London, is the largest and most thorough British effort in the style, by John Francis Bentley (1839–1902), but there are a number of other churches and other buildings such as the Christ Church, Brixton Road, also in London, by Arthur Beresford Pite, 1897–1903, near The Oval cricket ground and St Mary and St George Church, High Wycombe, (1935-1938). From about 1850 to 1880 in Bristol a related style known as Bristol Byzantine was popular for industrial buildings which combined elements of the Byzantine style with Moorish architecture. Newman University Church, Dublin (1885–86) is a notable Irish example.

United States
In the United States and elsewhere, the Neo-Byzantine style is often seen in vernacular amalgamations with other Medieval revivalist styles such as Romanesque and Gothic, or even with the Mission Revival or Spanish Colonial Revival styles.

The Basilica of the National Shrine of the Immaculate Conception is a large Catholic minor basilica and national shrine located in Washington, D.C., United States of America.
The shrine is the largest Catholic church in North America, one of the largest churches in the world, and the tallest habitable building in Washington, D.C. Its construction of Byzantine Revival and Romanesque Revival architecture began on September 23, 1920, with renowned contractor John McShain and was completed on December 8, 2017, with the dedication and solemn blessing of the Trinity Dome mosaic on December 8, 2017, the Feast of the Immaculate Conception, by Cardinal Donald William Wuerl.

Other notable US examples include many buildings on the campus of Rice University in Texas, and Christ Church United Methodist in Manhattan by Ralph Adams Cram; Cathedral of Saint Paul (Minnesota), Immaculate Conception Church in New Orleans, St. Francis de Sales Church in Philadelphia, Cathedral Basilica of St. Louis, and Sts. Peter and Paul Orthodox Church in Buffalo, New York.

Gallery

See also
Romanian Revival architecture – combines Byzantine Revival with Art Nouveau and others

References

External links

 Russian Neo-Byzantine Architecture

 
19th-century architecture
20th-century architecture
 
Revival architectural styles